Sergei Leonidovich Mosyakin (born 30 November 1963) is a Ukrainian botanist.

Bibliography

Botanical references

References

External links 

1961 births
Living people
Ukrainian botanists